The National Forestry Workers' Union of Japan (Nichirinro) was a trade union representing forestry and timber workers in Japan.

The union was founded in 1965 and affiliated to the Japanese Confederation of Labour.  By 1970, it had 10,062 members.  It transferred to the Japanese Trade Union Confederation in the late 1980s, but by 1996, its membership was down to 2,020.  In 2006, it merged into the Japanese Federation of Forest and Wood Workers' Union.

References

Timber industry trade unions
Trade unions established in 1965
Trade unions disestablished in 2006
Trade unions in Japan